Mayor and City Council of Baltimore City v. Dawson, 350 U.S. 877 (1955), was a per curiam order by the Supreme Court of the United States affirming an order by the United States Court of Appeals for the Fourth Circuit that enjoined racial segregation in public beaches and bathhouses. The case arose from a challenge to segregation at Sandy Point State Park in Maryland.

References 

1955 in United States case law
United States racial desegregation case law
United States Supreme Court cases
United States Supreme Court cases of the Warren Court
Parks in Maryland
History of Baltimore
Civil rights movement case law